Sypnoides chinensis is a species of moth of the family Noctuidae first described by Emilio Berio in 1958. It is found in Taiwan.

References

Moths described in 1958
Calpinae